Adriaanse is a Dutch and Afrikaans surname. Notable people with the surname include:

 Co Adriaanse (born 1947), Dutch footballer and manager
 Jacobie Adriaanse (born 1985), South African rugby union player
 Lourens Adriaanse (born 1988), South African rugby union player
 Wilna Adriaanse (born 1958), South African writer

References 

Dutch-language surnames
Afrikaans-language surnames
Patronymic surnames